The 2021 The Republicans (LR) congress, also known as the Congress for France (French: Congrès pour la France), was an organised internal primary held from 1 to 4 December. It was organised by the party in order to nominate the candidate that would represent it in the 2022 presidential election. Valérie Pécresse was chosen as the party's presidential nominee in a two-round voting process.

Context 
After François Fillon failed to reach the second round in the 2017 presidential election, Les Republicains were in opposition to centrist President Emmanuel Macron, who recruited several LR figures and adopted similar policies in some regards, especially around social policy. After a major failure in the 2019 European elections, Les Républicains did well in the 2020 municipal elections as well as in the 2021 regional and departmental elections.

The party was divided on the method of selecting its candidate for the 2022 presidential election. In 2016, the party had used an open primary, which brought a record 4.4 million voters in, but the surprise winner François Fillon did not manage to qualify for the run-off, and left the party weakened between Macron-compatible and right-wing factions. The polls for the 2022 election did not indicate that any candidate was emerging as a natural favorite, and the party may lose some votes on the right flank of the party to independent candidate Éric Zemmour.

On September 25, 2021, a consultation reserved for 79,000 LR members decided on the candidate selection process. 58% of voters choose a “closed” (internal) primary against 40.4% for an “open” primary and 1.6% of voters were blank. The statutes were amended accordingly, establishing a commission to filter the candidacies as well. There was also a possibility of revoking the support for the nominated candidate in order not to repeat the fiasco caused by the Fillon affair.

Voting method

Dates and voters 
The first round took place online from 8am on 1 December to 2pm on 2 December 2021. A second round was scheduled for 3 and 4 December 2021; if no candidate obtained more than 50% of the votes cast (which was the case), then the second round would be a run-off between the two candidates with the most votes.

Only members of Les Republicains could vote. At the deadline for signing up, the party had around 150,000 members, of whom 139,918 registered to vote.

Applications 
Each candidate must be sponsored by at least 250 LR elected representatives, spread over at least 30 departments (without more than a tenth of the signatories of the presentation being able to come from the same department).

Organization and control 
The organising committee of the primary was responsible for defining the practical details of the process and ensuring that it ran smoothly. It was composed of:

 Christian Jacob, president of LR and the president of the organising committee
 Annie Genevard, deputy vice-president of LR
 Aurélien Pradié, Secretary General of LR
 Daniel Fasquelle, national treasurer of LR
 Damien Abad, president of the LR group at the National Assembly
 Bruno Retailleau, president of the LR group in the Senate
 Bernard Deflesselles, representative of Xavier Bertrand
 Patrick Stefanini, representative of Valérie Pécresse
 Marie-Claire Carrère-Gée, representative of Michel Barnier
 François Varlet, representative of Philippe Juvin
 Alexandra Borchio-Fontimp, representative of Éric Ciotti

The control body was responsible for validating the composition of the electorate, the admissibility of candidatures and the sincerity of the results. It was composed of:

 Philippe Bas, senator
 Olivier Dutheillet de Lamothe, Honorary State Councilor
 Rémi-Pierre Drai, lawyer

Candidates 
The supervisory body admitted applications from six participants on 13 October 2021: Michel Barnier, Xavier Bertrand, Éric Ciotti, Philippe Juvin, Denis Payre and Valérie Pécresse. However, Denis Payre did not receive the necessary 250 sponsorships.

Candidates who met the support requirement

Eliminated candidates

Polls 
The percentages in bold show which two candidates would advance to the second round.

Results 
The results of the first round of voting were announced on 2 December 2021. A run-off was held between Ciotti and Pecresse on 3 December 2021, with the result being released the day after. The first round's outcome has been called surprising, with Ciotti outperforming what was expected and Bertrand, the expected front runner, fell into fourth. Bertrand declared his endorsement of Pécresse in the second round soon after the results came in. In the second round, Pécresse came out on top with over 60% of the vote.

References

2022 French presidential election
Primary elections in France
2021 elections in France